Arndt Kohn (born 3 September 1980) is a German politician who served as a Member of the European Parliament from 2017 until 2019. He is a member of the Social Democratic Party, part of the Party of European Socialists.

He replaced Martin Schulz, the former President of the European Parliament after Schulz resigned to contest the 2017 German federal election.

Parliamentary service
Member, Committee on Budgetary Control (2017-2019)
Member, Delegation to the EU-Albania Stabilisation and Association Parliamentary Committee (2017-2019)

Other activities
 German Federation for the Environment and Nature Conservation (BUND), Member

References

Living people
1980 births
Social Democratic Party of Germany MEPs
MEPs for Germany 2014–2019
People from Stolberg (Rhineland)